Ryan Christopher Biggs (5 March 1987 – 30 April 2022), known as DJ Delete, was an Australian DJ.

Discography

Album
Minimal Techno · 2009
Pure Spoonage · 2010
Malfunction EP · 2010
Formula EP · 2011
Sanctum · 2013 
DJ Networx, Volume 60 · 2014 
Louder Than a Bomb · 2016 
Hard Bass 2017 · 2017
Point of No Return · 2017
2018 EP · 2018
Alpha Omega · 2018 
Strive for Domination · 2019

Death
Biggs was found dead at his home in Waalwijk, Netherlands, He was 35 years old, no cause of death was given.

References

External links
https://www.discogs.com/artist/1915248-Delete-9

1987 births
2022 deaths
Place of birth missing
Year of birth uncertain
Australian DJs
21st-century Australian musicians
Place of death missing